Piazkar (also Romanized as Pīāzḵār, Pīāz Kār, and Pīyāz Kār; also known as Pīāzkār-e Rāhdār) is a village in Tashan-e Gharbi Rural District, Tashan District, Behbahan County, Khuzestan Province, Iran. At the 2006 census, its population was 397, in 81 families.

References 

Populated places in Behbahan County